Sweden competed at the 1980 Summer Paralympics in Arnhem, Netherlands. 94 competitors from Sweden won 91 medals including 31 gold, 36 silver and 24 bronze and finished 7th in the medal table.

See also 
 Sweden at the Paralympics
 Sweden at the 1980 Summer Olympics

References 

1980
1980 in Swedish sport
Nations at the 1980 Summer Paralympics